= BeHafizh =

Qur'anic verse learning mobile application

beHafizh
- Developer: Gudeg Barakah
- Initial release: v2.0
- Operating system: Android 4.1+
- License: Freeware
- Website: www.behafizh.com

BeHafizh is a mobile application to assist in the effort to memorize Qur'anic verses. The software runs on the Android operating system.

This application was made by a team from Gadjah Mada University (UGM) consisting of Farid Amin Ridwanto, Rian Adam Rajagede and Alfian Try Putranto in order to participate in the National Student Musabaqoh Tilawatil Quran (MTQ) held at University of Indonesia (UI) on 1- August 8, 2015. This application then won a gold medal in the branch of Computer Application Design in the competition.

== Features ==
=== Audio Player ===
Audio player, paragraph can be played repeatedly, with pause, and can be done on a certain range of Quranic verses.

=== Memorization Test ===
Memorization testing continues users to improve their memorization. Memorization Recorders improves user's ability to recite Quran.
